Ciliellopsis is a genus of air-breathing land snails, terrestrial pulmonate gastropod mollusks in the family Hygromiidae, the hairy snails and their allies.

Species
Species within the genus Ciliellopsis include:
 Ciliellopsis oglasae

References

 
Hygromiidae
Taxonomy articles created by Polbot